Babaeski is a town and district of Kırklareli Province in the Marmara region of Turkey. The countyship has a population of 29,342 and the total area of the district is 652 km2.

Name
The name Babaeski is believed to have originated according to the following legend: the Ottoman Sultan, Mehmet the Conqueror, stopped in town on his way to Constantinople before the final siege of the city. He happened to meet an old man in front of the old mosque which is nowadays called Small Mosque (Küçük Cami) and asked him when the town was established. The man replied "Eskidir, eski," meaning "It is old, old." When the Sultan asked the man's age, he replied again, "Baba... eski," which means "The father is old." From then on, the name Babaeski has been used for the town.

History 
In Byzantine times, the area was known as Boulgarophygon ( in Byzantine Greek), and was the site of a major Byzantine defeat by the Bulgarians in 896. In Greek is known as Arteskos (Αρτεσκός). In Ancient times, the city was also called Burtudizon, latinized as Burdidizum.

Facts
Babaeski lies on a relatively flat landscape where the highest point does not exceed 150 m. The Devil Stream (Şeytan Deresi) flows through the land of the district. Agriculture is the main industry. Sunflowers, wheat are the main crops grown along with some vegetables. Industrial development has sped up in the last decade mainly in the form of textile factories.

Babaeski hosts the annual Babaeski Agricultural Festival in late July to early August where national singers perform.

Population
The population in Babaeski and villages who belong to Babaeski District, are of different background, like Anatolian Turks, Balkan Turks-Muhacir, Yörüks, Amuca tribe, Muslim Megleno-Romanians, Pomaks, Romani people in Turkey and Crimean Tatars, are Cultural Muslims, who belong to the Hanafi school of Sunni Islam.

Sights
Some historical sites in Babaeski are:
Eski Cami (The Old Mosque), built during the Mehmet the Conqueror period in 1467. It is still in use.
Cedid Ali Paşa Camii, built by the great architect, Sinan, during the period of Süleyman the Magnificent in 1555. It is built in the style of the great Selimiye Mosque in Edirne which is also designed by Sinan. It was destroyed by the Bulgarian army during the Balkan Wars and was later reconstructed. It is also still open for worship.
Dördüzlü Çeşme (The Tetrahedral Fountain), built in the 17th century. It has four sides and a dome centered in a square.

Babaeski Bridge, built in 1633 during the period of Murad IV. It is part of D-100 international highway and is still in use.
The Bath, built in the classical single dome style. It is also still in use.
Atatürk Elementary School, built by the then sub-governor (kaymakam) Tevfik Gür in 1914. It is a one-story building with wooden roof and Ottoman Turkish style eaves. It now serves as the vocational school of the University of Thrace.

Gallery

See also
Ağayeri, Babaeski
Alpullu, Babaeski
Büyükmandıra, Babaeski
Çavuşköy, Babaeski
Çengerli, Babaeski
Çiğdemli, Babaeski
Düğüncülü, Babaeski
Erikleryurdu, Babaeski
Ertuğrulköy, Babaeski
Kadıköy, Babaeski
Karabayır, Babaeski
Karacaoğlan, Babaeski
Karahalil, Babaeski
Karamesutlu, Babaeski
Katranca, Babaeski
Kuleli, Babaeski
Kumrular, Babaeski
Kuzuçardağı, Babaeski
Minnetler, Babaeski
Mutlu, Babaeski
Müsellim, Babaeski
Nacak, Babaeski
Nadırlı, Babaeski
Oruçlu, Babaeski
Osmaniye, Babaeski
Pancarköy, Babaeski
Sinanlı, Babaeski
Sofuhalil, Babaeski
Taşağıl, Babaeski
Taşköprü, Babaeski
Terzili, Babaeski
Yeniköy, Babaeski
Yenimahalle, Babaeski

References

External links

 District municipality's official website

Cities in Turkey
Populated places in Kırklareli Province
Districts of Kırklareli Province